Jim Tunheim (born June 6, 1941) is an American politician in the state of Minnesota. He served in the Minnesota House of Representatives. He is currently the Treasurer of the Minnesota Senate District 54 DFL local party unit.

References

1941 births
Living people
Democratic Party members of the Minnesota House of Representatives
Place of birth missing (living people)